The Terre Haute prison experiments were conducted by Dr. John C. Cutler in 1943 and 1944 under Dr. John F. Mahoney, the head of the Venereal Disease Research Laboratory of the  US Public Health Service, to determine the effectiveness of treatments for sexually transmitted diseases.  The test subjects were prisoners at the U.S. Penitentiary in Terre Haute, Indiana. They were given disclosures and consented to the experiments.  A total of 241 prisoners participated in the study and received $100, a certificate of merit, and a letter of commendation to the parole board at the end of the study.  The researchers deposited various strains and concentrations of gonorrhea into the penises of the test subjects. After several months, Mahoney noted that the method of inducing gonorrhea in humans was unreliable and could not provide meaningful tests of prophylactic agents.

The Terre Haute experiments laid the foundation for and bore many similarities to the Guatemala syphilis experiments, including many of the same researchers, goals, and methods.

See also
 Tuskegee Syphilis Study

References 

Medical experimentation on prisoners
Human subject research in the United States
Clinical trials
Syphilis